Fallon Bowman (born 16 November 1983 in Cape Town, South Africa) is a musician and actor from London, Ontario, Canada, best known for her involvement with the band Kittie. She is of mixed ethnicity, as is characteristic of most Cape Coloureds from Cape Town. Since departing Kittie in 2001, Bowman has worked with Pigface and as a solo artist under the name Amphibious Assault, as well as under her own name.

Musical career

At age 14, Bowman co-founded Kittie with classmate Mercedes Lander and Mercedes' sister, Morgan Lander. She played guitar and performed background vocals for the band as heard on their Spit album and the Paperdoll EP. She left Kittie in August 2001.

In 2003, Bowman came across the term amphibious assault in a Tom Clancy novel and thought it would be a great name for an industrial band. She then recorded several tracks with Pigface for the band's 2003 album Easy Listening. Her enjoyment of the recording experience led her to begin writing music again. She purchased a sequencer and began exploring the Industrial music genre. Bowman filled her basement with drum machines and synthesizers and wrote the songs that made up Amphibious Assault's debut album, District Six, released on the Social Unrest label. Bowman's former Kittie bandmate, bassist Talena Atfield, and guitarist Pete Henderson also contributed to the project.

Amphibious Assault's second album was completed and originally scheduled for a June, and later, an August 2005 release. The release was postponed on both occasions, largely due to Bowman's school schedule which also caused her to miss her scheduled live appearances with Pigface. On 10 January 2007, Bowman announced via the Amphibious Assault website, that the second album, On Better Days and Sin-Eating, was finally available for purchase. The album was limited to 500 physical copies but was also made available via digital download.

In 2011, Bowman founded The Grace Dynasty, a five-piece band that included Rhim of The Birthday Massacre on drums. The band played a series of live shows before announcing their debut album. After recording was completed, the decision was made to drop the band name and release the album under Bowman's name. The album, Human Conditional, was released on 25 January 2011.

In November 2016, Bowman participated in Pigface's two-night 25th anniversary event in Chicago. In November 2019, Bowman joined Pigface for a concert at Toronto's Lee's Palace.

In January 2021, Bowman announced the return of Amphibious Assault, as well as a new album, titled Simulacrima. The album was released digitally on 12 February 2021, with physical copies made available a few months later.

In January 2022, Amphibious Assault released the single Death Ship.

Other work 
In 2010, Bowman was the subject of a prank for an episode of the Animal Planet series Freak Encounters. The episode reveals that she has a degree in archaeology. Bowman has also appeared in commercials and films.

Discography

As Amphibious Assault
 District Six (2003), Social Unrest
 On Better Days and Sin-Eating (2006), Social Unrest
 Simulacrima (2021), Independent
 Death Ship (Single, 2022), Independent

As Fallon Bowman
 Human, Conditional (2011), Social Unrest

With Kittie
 Spit (1999), Epic Records
 Paperdoll EP (2000), Artemis Records

With Pigface
 Easy Listening... (2003), Underground Inc.

References

External links
 

1983 births
Canadian electronic musicians
Canadian rock guitarists
Canadian women guitarists
Canadian heavy metal guitarists
Canadian women heavy metal singers
Canadian people of Dutch descent
Canadian people of Indonesian descent
Nu metal singers
Musicians from London, Ontario
Musicians from Cape Town
Pigface members
Living people
21st-century Canadian women singers
20th-century Canadian women singers
21st-century Canadian guitarists
Kittie members
21st-century women guitarists